Embach (part of the municipality of Lend) is an Austrian mountain village in Zell am See District of Salzburg, Austria. It is situated on a plateau high above the Salzachtal valley at an altitude of 1,013m. with a combined population of approximately 1,500 people.

External links
 Official website

Coordinates on Wikidata
Cities and towns in Zell am See District